Men's water polo at the 2010 Asian Games was held in Guangzhou, Guangdong, China from 18 to 25 November 2010. In this tournament, 9 teams played.

It also served as the Asian qualification for the 2011 World Aquatics Championships.

Squads

Results
All times are China Standard Time (UTC+08:00)

Preliminary

Group A

Group B

Final round

Quarterfinals

Classification 5th–8th

Semifinals

Classification 7th–8th

Classification 5th–6th

Bronze medal match

Gold medal match

Final standing

References

Results

External links
Waterpolo Site of 2010 Asian Games

Men